Commodore James Armstrong (17 January 1794 – 27 August 1868) was an officer in the United States Navy.

Armstrong joined the United States Navy as a midshipman in 1809 and served on the sloop-of-war  when it was seized by the British in 1814 during the War of 1812. Promoted to commodore and given command of the East India Squadron in 1855, Armstrong served aboard the squadron's flagship,  during the Second Opium War. Following the battle of the Pearl Forts, Armstrong's health began to fail and he returned to the United States.

In 1860 Armstrong was given command of the Pensacola Navy Yard.  On January 12, 1861, two days after Florida voted to secede from the Union he surrendered the facility to the secessionists.

Captain Armstrong was Court Martialed on May 4, 1861. "The proceedings of Captain Armstrong's court martial appears to be missing from the rest of the proceedings deposited in the National Archives so the testimony surrounding exactly what happened that day between Conway and Renshaw that lead to the Court submitting a communication to Welles is unavailable. Conway eventually got "some appropriate mark of approbation" bestowed in 1939 and 1942 when hulls DD-70 and DD-507 were named in his honor." - General Naval Order

Armstrong was born in Shelbyville, Kentucky. He died in Salem, Massachusetts at the age of 74 and is buried in the Harmony Grove Cemetery.

References

External links

General Naval Order

1794 births
1868 deaths
United States Navy commodores
United States Navy officers
People from Shelbyville, Kentucky
People of Kentucky in the American Civil War
United States Navy personnel of the War of 1812
Burials at Harmony Grove Cemetery